The National Beta Club (often called "Beta Club" or simply "Beta") is an organization for 4th through 12th grade students in the United States. Its purpose is "to promote the ideals of academic achievement, character, leadership and service among elementary and secondary school students.". Headquartered in Spartanburg, South Carolina, the organization has more than 8,750 clubs nationally and internationally.

History and description
Beta is an academic honors program with a strong emphasis on leadership and community service. It was founded in 1934 by Dr. John W. Harris, a Wofford College professor. Its motto is "Let Us Lead By Serving Others." Traditionally, students are awarded membership based on their grades (GPA), or test scores and character traits. Each individual school chooses what items they will look at for their chapter's member qualifications.

The Junior Division of The National Beta Club, begun in 1961, is for students in 4th through 8th grade, divided into Division I (grades 4-5) and Division II (grades 6-8). The Senior Division of Beta is for 9th through 12th graders. There are more than 500,000 active Betas in the Senior and Junior divisions and over 7 million alumni.

Conventions
Every year students on the Senior level compete in academic and talent competitions such as speech, Quiz Bowl, creative writing, English, math, science, social studies, spelling, group talent, special talent, oratory and character skits. On the junior level, students can participate in science, social studies, language arts, spelling, math, visual and performing arts, arts and crafts, poetry, T-shirt design, banner, scrapbook, essay, living literature, and songfest and speech competitions. In order to compete at the national level, a participant must place at the state level. This also includes those candidates running for office. The first National Beta Club convention was held in June 1981, at the Sheraton Twin Towers in Orlando, Florida. Each year there is a new theme, and a new site for the National Convention.

State conventions are a bit different from the national conventions. State conventions are held by the state sponsor and the state sponsor elect, which are elected to the position by other sponsors from the state. The state has the authority to create or deny competitions from happening in their own state. The Junior Convention hosts similar competitions except for state office. At the Senior level, there are three positions; at the Junior level, there are five.

States that host state conventions: Alabama, Arkansas, Florida, Georgia, Illinois, Indiana, Kentucky, Louisiana, Missouri, Mississippi, North Carolina, Ohio, Oklahoma, South Carolina, Tennessee, Texas, Virginia, and West Virginia.

Convention Themes & Locations:

 2011–2012 ' Greensboro, North Carolina

 2012–2013 The Heart of Beta Mobile, Alabama
 2013–2014 Making History With Beta Richmond, Virginia
 2014–2015 Betas, Rockin' the country Nashville, Tennessee
 2015–2016 Let the Beta Times Roll New Orleans, Louisiana
 2016–2017 Above and Beyond Orlando, Florida
 2017–2018 Beta on My Mind Savannah, Georgia
 2018–2019 Betas Fueling the Future Oklahoma City, Oklahoma
 2019–2020 Beta As Far As You Can See Fort Worth, Texas
 2020–2021 It All Began with Beta Orlando, Florida
 2021–2022' Beta Together'' Nashville, Tennessee

Prominent Beta alumni
Bill Clinton, 42nd President of the United States
Millard Fuller, Habitat for Humanity founder
Jake Delhomme, professional football athlete
Ericka Dunlap, Miss America 2004
Heather French, Miss America 2000
Diane Sawyer, television journalist
Herschel Walker, professional football athlete
Trisha Yearwood, country musician
Kevin Durant, professional basketball player, actor
Cam Newton, professional football player 
Larriuna Shell, professional dancer 
Scotty McCreery, country musician
Trevor Bayne, NASCAR driver
Justin Timberlake, American singer-songwriter

See also
High school club
Honor Society

References

External links
 

Student societies in the United States
High school honor societies
Organizations established in 1934
Youth organizations based in South Carolina